Déjenme Llorar (English: "Let Me Cry"), is the debut studio album by Mexican singer and songwriter Carla Morrison, released on March 27, 2012, through Cosmica Records. It was produced by Morrison alongside Juan Manuel Torreblanca and Andrés Landon.

The album was nominated for the Grammy Award for Best Latin Rock, Urban or Alternative Album at the 55th Annual Grammy Awards, being Morrison's first Grammy nomination. At the 13th Annual Latin Grammy Awards, the project was nominated for Album of the Year and won Best Alternative Music Album, while the title track was nominated for Song of the Year and won Best Alternative Song, being Morrison's first Latin Grammy wins.

Déjenme Llorar topped the Mexican Albums chart and peaked at numbers 15 and 56 at the Latin Pop Albums and Top Latin Albums charts, respectively. It was certified platinum in Mexico, being Morrison's first and only album to date to achieve that.

Background
The album followed Morrison's previous EPs Aprendiendo a Aprender (2009) and Mientras Tú Dormías... (2010), the project was announced prior to the last concert of the tour she embarqued on to promoted the latter EP during 2011, the tour spanned several cities in both Mexico and United States, and culminated in a concert at the Teatro Metropólitan in Mexico City, Morrison decided to work on the album independently instead of signing to a label, she said that "It is not because if you sign, it means that you have already sold yourself, rather it is because I do not like to work under pressure, but rather at my own pace", about the sound of the album she said that "it will be more folk-sounding, it has the same intensity but with a more latin american tint".

Singles
The title track of the album "Déjenme Llorar" was released as the album's first single followed by "Hasta la Piel" on March 21, 2012. The song peaked at nomber 50 in the Latin Digital Songs Sales chart. The songs "Eres Tú" and "Disfruto" were released as the album's third and fourth singles, the latter entered the Mexico Espanol Airplay chart, peaking at 38, being her highest appearance in the chart.

Track listing
All tracks are produced by Morrison, Juan Manuel Torreblanca and Andres Landon.

Charts

Weekly charts

Certification

Awards and nominations

References

2012 debut albums
Carla Morrison albums
Latin Grammy Award for Best Alternative Music Album